Ţiriac Holdings Ltd. is a Romanian company primarily owned by Ion Ţiriac. Among its operations are car dealership, vehicle leasing, real estate, elevator manufacturing, transport and leasing of executive jets (Ţiriac Air), banking (UniCredit Țiriac Bank), and insurance (Allianz Ţiriac). It also has a 49% interest in a joint venture with DaimlerChrysler for the sales and marketing of all DaimlerChrysler automotive brands in Romania. 
Allianz Tiriac was found initially under the name ASIT - Asigurari Ion Tiriac in 1994. ASIT was integrated in 2000 in Allianz Group.

External links 
Tiriac Auto
Tiriac AIR
Tiriac Leasing
HVB-Tiriac Bank
Allianz Tiriac Insurance
DaimlerChrysler Automotive Romania
Article in Ziarul Financiar
Article about DaimlerChrysler joint venture on WardsAuto.com
Article about CEO Anca Ioan in The Diplomat - Bucharest

Holding companies of Romania
Companies based in Bucharest